Tris((1-benzyl-4-triazolyl)methyl)amine (TBTA) is a tertiary amine containing the 1,2,3-triazole moiety. When used as a ligand, complexed to copper(I), it allows for quantitative, regioselective formal Huisgen 1,3-dipolar cycloadditions between alkynes and azides, in a variety of aqueous and organic solvents.

It is believed that the ligand promotes catalysis through the stabilization of the copper(I)-oxidation state, while still allowing for the catalytic cycle of the CuAAC reaction to proceed.

Single crystal X-ray diffraction of the Cu(I) complex of tris((1-benzyl-4-triazolyl)methyl)amine revealed an unusual dinuclear dication with one triazole unit bridging two metal centers, and is an effective catalyst for the 'click' cycloaddition reaction. The structure of the complex of TBTA with Cu(II) in the crystalline state is trigonal bipyramidal and can be reduced to the active 'click' catalyst form by sodium ascorbate, copper metal, or other reducing agents.

In the literature, it has been gaining widespread use as a biochemical tool for the tagging of proteins and enzymes. The compound is now commercially available through Sigma-Aldrich and Invitrogen. It may be prepared by the click reaction between tripropargylamine and benzyl azide:

References

Reagents for organic chemistry
Benzyl compounds